The 1994–95 Weber State Wildcats men's basketball team represented Weber State College during the 1994–95 NCAA Division I men's basketball season. Members of the Big Sky Conference, the Wildcats were led by fourth-year head coach Ron Abegglen and played their home games on campus at Dee Events Center in Ogden, Utah.

Senior shooting guard Ruben Nembhard was named MVP of the conference tournament.

Seeded 14th in the Southeast region, Weber State met No. 3 seed Michigan State in the first round at the Tallahassee-Leon County Civic Center in Tallahassee, Florida. The Wildcats stunned the Spartans, winning 79–72. In the second, Weber State pushed the Georgetown before losing 53–51.

Nembhard was named Big Sky Player of the Year.

Postseason result

|-
!colspan=6 style=| Big Sky tournament

|-
!colspan=6 style=| NCAA tournament

References

External links
Sports Reference – Weber State Wildcats: 1994–95 basketball season

Weber State Wildcats men's basketball seasons
Weber State
Weber State